"Carolina On My Mind" may refer to:

"South Carolina on My Mind", a song about the U.S. state of South Carolina
"Carolina in My Mind", a song by James Taylor about his North Carolina childhood
"Carolina in My Mind", an episode from the thirteenth season of the television series What Would You Do?